The Department of Works was an Australian government department that existed between February and July 1945. It was the second so-named Australian Government department.

History
The department was established in February 1945 under the Curtin Government. Less than five months later, in July 1945, it was dismantled by the Chifley Government soon after the death of John Curtin.

Structure
The Department was a Commonwealth Public Service department, staffed by officials who were responsible to the Minister for Works, Bert Lazzarini. The Director-General of the Department was Louis F. Loder.

References

Works
Ministries established in 1945
1945 establishments in Australia
1945 disestablishments in Australia